Guy Sibille (born 25 August 1948) is a former French racing cyclist. He won the French national road race title in 1976. He also competed in the team time trial at the 1972 Summer Olympics.

References

External links
 

1948 births
Living people
French male cyclists
Cyclists from Marseille
Olympic cyclists of France
Cyclists at the 1972 Summer Olympics